Jehjeh or Jeh Jeh or Jahjah may refer to:
 Jehjeh, Izeh
 Jeh Jeh, Masjed Soleyman